Sagarika Ghatge is an Indian actress and  model who primarily works in Hindi films. She is known for her role of Preeti Sabharwal in Chak De! India. In 2015, she participated in Fear Factor: Khatron Ke Khiladi 6 and emerged as a finalist. Ghatge is a national-level field hockey player.

Early life
Ghatge was born to Vijaysinh Ghatge  (not Vijayendra Ghatge, as sometimes reported) and Urmila Ghatge in a Maharashtrian Family in Kolhapur, Maharashtra, where she stayed till the age of eight. She then shifted to Ajmer, Rajasthan to attend Mayo College Girls School. She is related to a former royal house of India through Shahu Maharaj of Kolhapur, with her father being from the former royal family of Kagal and her grandmother, Sita Raje Ghatge, being the daughter of Tukojirao Holkar III of Indore. She has a brother. She was a national level hockey player.

Personal life

On 24 April 2017, Ghatge announced her engagement to cricketer Zaheer Khan. The two got married in November 2017.

Career
In 2007, Ghatge made her acting debut in Chak De! India, where she portrayed Preeti Sabharwal due to which she became the brand ambassador of Reebok India. She has appeared in fashion magazines and various fashion shows.

Ghatge then appeared in the 2009 film, Fox as Urvashi Mathur. She later portrayed Kamiah in Miley Naa Miley Hum. Ghatge then starred opposite Emraan Hashmi in the 2012 film Rush. She next appeared in Satish Rajwade's Marathi movie Premachi Goshta with Atul Kulkarni which released in 2013 which was her first Marathi movie.

In 2015, she participated in Fear Factor: Khatron Ke Khiladi 9 and emerged as a finalist. Ghatge also made her Punjabi film debut, Dildariyaan opposite Jassi Gill where she portrayed Paali.

In 2017, she played Maya Singh in critically acclaimed Irada.

In 2019, she made her digital debut with ALT Balaji's Boss – Baap of Special Services where she portrayed ACP Sakshi Ranjan opposite Karan Singh Grover.

Filmography

Films

Television

Web

Awards
For her role in Chak De! India, Ghatge received the Screen Award for Best Supporting Actress. She was also rewarded with a Lions Gold Award.

References

External links

 Sagarika Ghatge at IMDb 
 
 

1986 births
Living people
Indian film actresses
People from Kolhapur
Fear Factor: Khatron Ke Khiladi participants